The Banpo Bridge (Korean: 반포대교; Hanja: 盤浦大橋) is a major bridge in downtown Seoul over the Han River, South Korea, connecting the Seocho and Yongsan districts. The bridge is on top of Jamsu Bridge, forming the upper half of a double-deck bridge; it is the first double deck bridge built in South Korea. During periods of high rainfall, the Jamsu Bridge is designed to submerge as the water level of the river rises, as the lower deck lies close to the waterline. In the past decade, the bridge has submerged every year, and the bridge and surrounding area is cleared of mud and silt shortly afterward. The bridge was built as a girder bridge and was completed in 1982.

The south side, during times without global pandemics, has a yearly fall market, with live music and food trucks. The northern side has several bike and skating ramps.

Moonlight Rainbow Fountain
The Moonlight Rainbow Fountain (Korean: 달빛무지개 분수) is the world's longest bridge fountain that set a Guinness World Record with nearly 10,000 LED nozzles that run along both sides that is 1,140m long, shooting out 190 tons of water per minute. Installed in September 2009 on the Banpo Bridge, former mayor of Seoul Oh Se-hoon declared that the bridge will further beautify the city and showcase Seoul's eco-friendliness, as the water is pumped directly from the river itself and continuously recycled. The bridge has 38 water pumps and 380 nozzles on either side, which draw 190 tons of water per minute from the river 20 meters below the deck, and shoots as far as 43 meters horizontally.

References

Bridges in Seoul
Buildings and structures in Seoul
Bridges completed in 1982
Bridges over the Han River (Korea)
1982 establishments in South Korea
20th-century architecture in South Korea